Anthurium forgetii is a species of plant in the genus Anthurium native to Colombia. Kept in cultivation for its round leaves that lack a sinus and have silver veining, it is thought to be epiphytic.

References 

forgetii
Flora of Colombia
Taxa named by N. E. Brown
Plants described in 1906